Anaphia, also known as tactile anesthesia, is a medical symptom in which there is a total or partial absence of the sense of touch.
Anaphia is a common symptom of spinal cord injury and neuropathy.

See also 
 Dysesthesia
 Hyperesthesia
 Hypoesthesia

References 

Symptoms and signs of mental disorders
Symptoms and signs: Nervous and musculoskeletal systems
Neurological disorders
Anesthesia